In mathematics, a map or mapping is a function in its general sense.  These terms may have originated as from the process of making a geographical map: mapping the Earth surface to a sheet of paper.

The term map may be used to distinguish some special types of functions, such as homomorphisms. For example, a linear map is a homomorphism of vector spaces, while the term linear function may have this meaning or it may mean a linear polynomial. In category theory, a map may refer to a morphism. The term transformation can be used interchangeably, but transformation often refers to a function from a set to itself. There are also a few less common uses in logic and graph theory.

Maps as functions

In many branches of mathematics, the term map is used to mean a function, sometimes with a specific property of particular importance to that branch. For instance, a "map" is a "continuous function" in topology, a "linear transformation" in linear algebra, etc.

Some authors, such as Serge Lang, use "function" only to refer to maps in which the codomain is a set of numbers (i.e. a subset of R or C), and reserve the term mapping for more general functions.

Maps of certain kinds are the subjects of many important theories. These include homomorphisms in abstract algebra, isometries in geometry, operators in analysis and representations in group theory.  

In the theory of dynamical systems, a map denotes an evolution function used to create discrete dynamical systems. 

A partial map is a partial function. Related terms such as domain, codomain, injective, and continuous can be applied equally to maps and functions, with the same meaning. All these usages can be applied to "maps" as general functions or as functions with special properties.

As morphisms

In category theory, "map" is often used as a synonym for "morphism" or "arrow", which is a structure-respecting function and thus may imply more structure than "function" does. For example, a morphism  in a concrete category (i.e. a morphism that can be viewed as a function) carries with it the information of its domain (the source  of the morphism) and its codomain (the target ). In this sense, the function does not capture the set  that is used as the codomain; only the range  is determined by the function.

See also
 
 Arrow notation – e.g., also known as map
 
 
 List of chaotic maps
 Maplet arrow (↦) – commonly pronounced "maps to"

References

Works cited

External links

 
Basic concepts in set theory